Alando may refer to:
Alando, Haute-Corse, a commune in the Haute-Corse department in France
Alando Terrelonge, Jamaican politician and government minister
Alando Tucker (b. 1984), an American professional basketball player
Alando Soakai (b. 1983), a New Zealand Rugby Union player
Alando (company), an auction house company based in Germany
Alando Walter, Kenyan Urban Planner and Geoinformation Science expert

eu:Alando